Capital Electric Cooperative is a public utility cooperative based in Bismarck, North Dakota.  It serves customers throughout rural Burleigh County (including parts of Bismarck) and portions of Sheridan and Emmons Counties. It is a member of, and receives power from the Central Power Electric Cooperative.

External links
Capital Electric Cooperative site

Electric cooperatives in North Dakota
Bismarck–Mandan
Electric power companies of the United States